Karz: The Burden of Truth is a 2002 Indian Hindi action drama film directed by Harry Baweja and produced by Kaushal Godha. The film features Sunny Deol, Sunil Shetty and Shilpa Shetty as main characters.

Plot 
Police Inspector Suraj is an orphan, who was rejected by his biological mother, for reason(s) unknown. Suraj has grown up questioning as to how any mother could reject her own child. He meets with Raja, and after a few misunderstandings, both become fast friends. Raja introduces him to his mom, Savitri, who welcomes and accepts him. Suraj loves Sapna, and hopes to marry her someday. Unfortunately, he finds out that Raja also loves Sapna, and decides to step away, and takes to alcohol. When Savitri's mom meets prominent politician, Yuvraj, she recognizes him as a wanted criminal, Thakur, but Yuvraj denies being Thakur nor having any connection with Thakur. This leads Suraj to wonder as to what prompted Savitri to point a finger at Yuvraj. His investigation will lead him to his birth mother, as well as his biological father, and he will come to know why his mother rejected him.

Cast
Sunny Deol as Suraj Singh
Suniel Shetty as Raja Chauhan
Shilpa Shetty as Sapna 
Ashutosh Rana as Rajpal Thakur
Vishwajeet Pradhan as Gogi
Shammi as Balwant Singh's mother.
Kiron Kher as Savitri Devi Singh, Suraj's biological mother.
Rajeev Verma as Balwant Singh, Suraj's adoptive father.
Sayaji Shinde as Himmatbhai
Johnny Lever as Jugnu
Himani Shivpuri as Jugnu's wife
Deepak Shirke as Madhav Singh 
Shahbaz Khan as Police Inspector Khan
Adi Irani as Gupta
Arun Bakshi as Cheema

Music

The music of the film is composed by Sanjeev Darshan and lyrics are penned by Sameer.

Reception
Taran Adarsh of IndiaFM gave the film 1.5 stars out of 5, writing ″On the whole, KARZ-THE BURDEN OF TRUTH is a typical masala fare that relies too heavily on the tried and tested stuff, thus limiting its appeal. The Idd holidays may prove beneficial to an extent, but a long run is ruled out.″ Sukanya Verma of Rediff.com wrote ″This 17-reel painfully (pun intended) lengthy film leaves you with stiff limbs and sore eyes. In a nutshell, Karz: The Burden of Truth stands true to its title.″

References

External links

2000s Hindi-language films
Indian action drama films
2002 action drama films
2002 films
Films directed by Harry Baweja